Mexico competed at the 2017 World Games held in Wrocław, Poland.

Archery 

Rodolfo González and Linda Ochoa won the silver medal in the mixed team compound event.

Bowling 

Sandra Góngora and Tannya López won the bronze medal in the women's doubles event.

Ju-jitsu 

Dan Schon won the gold medal in the men's ne-waza 85 kg event.

Eduardo Gutiérrez won the bronze medal in the men's fighting 69 kg event.

Track speed skating 

Mike Páez won the bronze medal in the men's 10000 metre points elimination event.

References 

Nations at the 2017 World Games
2017 in Mexican sports
2017